Pine Grove, West Virginia may refer to multiple places:

Pine Grove, Fayette County, West Virginia
Pine Grove, Marion County, West Virginia
Pine Grove, Pleasants County, West Virginia
Pine Grove, Wetzel County, West Virginia, a town